"Talkin' About" is a song by American recording artist Amerie. It was co-written and produced by Rich Harrison for her  second album, Touch (2005). According to Amerie, it is one of her "really personal" songs and may be her favorite track on the album. Released as a promotional single, "Talkin' About" peaked at number two on the US Billboard Bubbling Under R&B/Hip-Hop Singles chart. There was a remix made featuring East Coast rapper Jadakiss.

It was the third single from the album, and Amerie told MTV News in August 2005 that she would be co-directing the music video with Chris Robinson, with whom she collaborated on the videos for the two previous singles, "1 Thing" and "Touch". However, the video was not filmed.

Charts

Weekly charts

References

2005 singles
Amerie songs
Song recordings produced by Rich Harrison
Songs written by Rich Harrison
Songs written by Amerie
Dance-pop songs
2005 songs
Columbia Records singles